Thomas F. Schaller (born January 17, 1967) is Professor of Political Science at  University of Maryland, Baltimore County (UMBC).  A weekly political columnist for the Baltimore Sun, he has published commentaries in a variety of publications, including the New York Times, Washington Post, Boston Globe, Salon, The American Prospect and The Nation.

He is author of Whistling Past Dixie: How Democrats Can Win Without the South.  He is also the author of The Stronghold: How Republicans Captured Congress but Surrendered the White House (Yale University, 2015) and "Common Enemies: Georgetown Basketball, Miami Football and the Racial Transformation of College Sports" (University of Nebraska Press, 2021). From 2009 to 2010, Schaller was a regular contributor to FiveThirtyEight.com.

References 

American political scientists
University of Maryland, Baltimore County faculty
Living people
Place of birth missing (living people)
1967 births